Stuart Head is a male British former field hockey player

Hockey career
Head represented England and won a bronze medal, at the 1998 Commonwealth Games in Kuala Lumpur.

Personal life
He coaches field hockey at Epsom College alongside former teammate Michael Johnson.

References

Living people
British male field hockey players
Commonwealth Games medallists in field hockey
Commonwealth Games bronze medallists for England
Field hockey players at the 1998 Commonwealth Games
Year of birth missing (living people)
Medallists at the 1998 Commonwealth Games